Plagiobothrys collinus is a species of flowering plant in the borage family known by the common name Cooper's popcornflower.

Distribution
The annual plant is native to California, Arizona, and northern Baja California (Mexico).

It can be found in many types of habitats, including coastal sage scrub, chaparral, valley grassland, and open areas of oak woodland.

Description
Plagiobothrys collinus is an annual herb with a spreading or erect stem  in length. The leaves along the stem are 1 to 4 centimeters long, the lower ones oppositely arranged and the upper ones alternate. The herbage is coated in fine and rough hairs.

The inflorescence is a long, widely spaced series of tiny flowers, each with a five-lobed white corolla no more than 7 millimeters wide, sometimes as small as one millimeter. The bloom period is February through May.

The fruit is a minute nutlet with angular cross-ribs visible in magnification.

Varieties
Varieties include:
Plagiobothrys collinus var. californicus — California popcorn flower, primarily Peninsular Ranges in California and Baja California (México).
Plagiobothrys collinus var. fulvescens  — California popcornflower, rusty haired popcorn flower, native to California chaparral and woodlands habitats in California and Baja California.
Plagiobothrys collinus var. gracilis —  Graceful popcorn flower, endemic to coastal sage scrub in Southern California, including the Channel Islands.
Plagiobothrys collinus var. ursinus — Northern popcorn flower, native to eastern Transverse Ranges and  Peninsular Ranges in southern California and northwestern Baja California.

References

External links
 Calflora Database: Plagiobothrys collinus (Cooper's popcornflower)
Jepson Manual eFlora (TJM2) treatment of Plagiobothrys collinus
UC Photos gallery: Plagiobothrys collinus 

collinus
Flora of California
Flora of Arizona
Flora of Baja California
Natural history of the California chaparral and woodlands
Natural history of the California Coast Ranges
Natural history of the Channel Islands of California
Natural history of the Peninsular Ranges
Natural history of the Transverse Ranges
Flora without expected TNC conservation status